Pervagor is a genus of filefishes native to the Indian and Pacific Oceans.

Species
There are currently 8 recognized species in this genus:
 Pervagor alternans (J. D. Ogilby, 1899) (Yelloweye filefish)
 Pervagor aspricaudus (Hollard, 1854) (Orangetail filefish)
 Pervagor janthinosoma (Bleeker, 1854) (Blackbar filefish)
 Pervagor marginalis Hutchins, 1986
 Pervagor melanocephalus (Bleeker, 1853) (Redtail filefish)
 Pervagor nigrolineatus (Herre, 1927) (Black-lined filefish)
 Pervagor randalli Hutchins, 1986
 Pervagor spilosoma (Lay & E. T. Bennett, 1839) (Fantail filefish)

References

External links 

 PERVAGOR ALTERNANS from New Caledonia (En/Fr)
 PERVAGOR ASPRICAUDUS from New Caledonia (En/Fr)

Monacanthidae
Marine fish genera
Taxa named by Gilbert Percy Whitley